Timothy Davis (April 12, 1821 – October 23, 1888) was a member of the  United States House of Representatives from Massachusetts.

Davis was born in Gloucester, Massachusetts and attended the public schools. He served two years in a printing office, engaged in mercantile pursuits in Boston.

Political career
Davis served as member of the Massachusetts House of Representatives in 1870 and 1871.  He was elected as the candidate of the American Party to the Thirty-fourth Congress and as a Republican to the Thirty-fifth Congress (March 4, 1855 – March 3, 1859).

Life after Congress
Davis served as delegate to the Republican National Convention in 1860. He was appointed assistant appraiser in the Boston customhouse in 1861.
He engaged in the prosecution of claims against the Government. He died in Boston, Massachusetts, on October 23, 1888. He was interred in Oak Grove Cemetery.

References

1821 births
1888 deaths
People from Gloucester, Massachusetts
Republican Party members of the Massachusetts House of Representatives
Know-Nothing members of the United States House of Representatives from Massachusetts
Republican Party members of the United States House of Representatives from Massachusetts
19th-century American politicians